A usurper is an illegitimate or controversial claimant to power, often but not always in a monarchy. In other words, one who takes the power of a country, city, or established region for oneself, without any formal or legal right to claim it as one's own. Usurpers can rise to power in a region by often unexpected physical force, as well as through political influence and deceit.

Etymology

The word originally came from the Latin word usurpare (“to seize", "to take forcefully" or "to use”).

Politics

The Greeks had their own conception of what usurpers were, calling them tyrants. In the ancient Greek usage, a tyrant (tyrannos/τύραννος in Greek) was an individual who rose to power via unconstitutional or illegitimate means, usually not being an heir to an existing throne. Such individuals were perceived negatively by political philosophers such as Socrates, Plato and Aristotle.

Usurpers often try to legitimize their position by claiming to be a descendant of a ruler that they may or may not be related to.

See also 

 Embezzlement
 Misappropriation
 Roman usurper
 List of usurpers
 Coup d'état

Further reading

References

 
Positions of authority